Pleurostomataceae is a family of fungi in the order Calosphaeriales.

References

External links 

Ascomycota families
Calosphaeriales